The Nordic Music Prize is an annual award for the Best Nordic Album Of The Year, inspired by the Mercury Prize and introduced in 2010. The prize was initiated by the by:Larm conference in Norway. The first Nordic Music Prize was presented by the Prince Of Norway during by:Larm in Oslo in February 2011.

The prize was created to create a stronger unity across the Nordic countries industry, to increase international interest and awareness of what the region has to offer musically and, to refocus on the full-length album as an art form.

The winner is decided by a selection involving each Nordic country's domestic recording industry, that lead to representatives converging on Oslo with a list of ten albums from their nation, and these are then whittled down to 12 final nominations. The final choice is made by a jury composed of international journalists and label people.

Jury
Jude Rogers – Journalist/music critic of The Guardian
Stuart Maconie – Radio DJ/music critic of BBC
Eric Deines – director of A&R and Communication Jagjaguwar
Jeannette Lee – co-owner of Rough Trade Records / Rough Trade Management

The Nordic Music Prize Committee
Anna Ullman – Denmark
Annah Björk – Sweden
Ilkka Mattila – Finland
Audun Vinger – Norway
Arnar Eggert Thoroddsen – Iceland

Winners and nominees

See also
 Polar Music Prize (Sweden)
 Mercury Prize (UK)
 Choice Music Prize (Ireland)
 Polaris Music Prize (Canada)
 Prix Constantin (France)
 Shortlist Music Prize (United States)
 Australian Music Prize (Australia)

References

External links

European music awards
International music organizations
Nordic music